Karen Witt is a female former international table tennis player from England.

Table tennis career
She represented England at four successive World Table Tennis Championships, from 1979-1985, in the Corbillon Cup (women's team event).

She won a European Table Tennis Championships medal and won three English National Table Tennis Championships including the singles in 1983. Her representative county was Berkshire.

See also
 List of England players at the World Team Table Tennis Championships

References

English female table tennis players
Living people
Year of birth missing (living people)